Beaidh (d. 523) was an Irish bishop (of Roscommon) in the 6th century.

References 

523 deaths
6th-century Irish bishops
Bishops of Ardcarne